These are the official results of the Men's 2.000m Tandem Race at the 1952 Summer Olympics in Helsinki, Finland, held from July 28 to July 31, 1952. There were fourteen couples participating in this competition.

Final classification

References

External links
 Official Report

T
Cycling at the Summer Olympics – Men's tandem
Track cycling at the 1952 Summer Olympics